Veliki Preslav Municipality (former Preslav Municipality) is a municipality (obshtina) in Shumen Province, Northeastern Bulgaria, located in the area of the so-called Fore-Balkan north of the eastern part of the Stara planina mountains. It is named after its administrative centre, the town of Veliki Preslav, which was one of the ancient capitals of Bulgaria.

Settlements 

Veliki Preslav Municipality includes the following 12 places (towns are shown in bold):

Demography 
The following table shows the change of the population during the last four decades.

Ethnic composition
According to the 2011 census, among those who answered the optional question on ethnic identification, the ethnic composition of the municipality was the following:

Religion
According to the latest Bulgarian census of 2011, the religious composition, among those who answered the optional question on religious identification, was the following:

See also
Provinces of Bulgaria
Municipalities of Bulgaria
List of cities and towns in Bulgaria

References

External links
 Official website 

Municipalities in Shumen Province